The Men's Heavyweight powerlifting event at the 2018 Commonwealth Games in Gold Coast, Australia, took place at Carrara Sports and Leisure Centre on 10 April 2018.

Result

References

Powerlifting at the 2018 Commonwealth Games